"Blanket on the Ground" is a song written by Roger Bowling, and recorded by American country music singer Billie Jo Spears.  It was released in February 1975 as the second single and title track from the album Blanket on the Ground. Irish born singer Philomena Begley covered the song as the lead single from her 1975 LP of the same name. The single was released on August 4, 1975 in Ireland and August 6, 1975 in the United Kingdom reaching number 1 and number 4 in the UK and Ireland respectively.

Content
The song is sung from the point of view of a middle-aged woman who coaxes her hesitant husband outdoors to make love in the moonlight.

Chart performance
The song reached #1 on Billboard Magazine's Hot Country Singles chart, and #78 on the Hot 100 pop charts. In the United Kingdom, the song reached #6 on the pop charts.

Weekly charts

Year-end charts

Philomena Begley version

"Blanket On The Ground" was covered by Country music artist Philomena Begley as the lead single from her 1975 LP of the same name . The single was released on August 4, 1975 in Ireland and August 6, 1975 in the United Kingdom. The LP was re-released on CD in 1988.

Background
Begley's cover took her to number five in the Irish chart. Spears also released the song in the United Kingdom and in Ireland at the same time as Begley, but Begley's version received the highest sales, as Spears' version only went to number 11. Begley occasionally performed the song with Spears and later recorded a tribute song to her after the American star's death in 2011. Begley's edition has been re-recorded a number of times since and is featured on her 'Greatest Hits' album.

Chart performance

References

1975 singles
1975 songs
Billie Jo Spears songs
Songs written by Roger Bowling (songwriter)
Song recordings produced by Larry Butler (producer)
United Artists Records singles